Sanjay Kapoor  (born 15 July 1962) is an Indian Congress politician and a member of the 16th Legislative Assembly of Uttar Pradesh of India. He represented the Bilaspur constituency of Uttar Pradesh and is also a National Secretary of the Indian National Congress.

Early life and education
Sanjay Kapoor was born in Rampur district. He attended the M. J. P. Rohilkhand University and attained Bachelor of Commerce & Bachelor of Laws degrees.

Political career
Sanjay Kapoor has been a MLA for two terms. He represented the Bilaspur constituency and is also a National Secretary of the Indian National Congress.

He lost his seat in the 2017 Uttar Pradesh Assembly election to Baldev Singh Aulakh of the Bharatiya Janata Party.

Posts held

See also
Bilaspur
Sixteenth Legislative Assembly of Uttar Pradesh
Uttar Pradesh Legislative Assembly

References 

1962 births
Living people
People from Rampur district
Indian National Congress politicians
Uttar Pradesh MLAs 2012–2017
Uttar Pradesh MLAs 2007–2012